Blackwall was a 50-gun fourth-rate ship of the line of the English Royal Navy, launched at Blackwall Yard in 1696.

In September 1705, whilst under the command of Captain Samuel Martin Blackwall, along with two smaller vessels, had been ordered to convoy some merchantmen to the Baltic. On 20 October, as Blackwall and her two consorts HMS Sorlings and HMS Pendennis were convoying the return voyage, they encountered a superior French force. All the English ships were captured, Blackwall herself being taken by the French ship Protée. Both Captain Martin and the French commander were killed in the action.

Blackwall was commissioned into the French Navy under the name Blekoualle; she was recaptured on 15 March 1708 but was not taken back into service in the Royal Navy, the decision being taken to have her broken up instead. However, she was captured again by the French in 1709, this time being named Blakoual, remaining in French service until disposed of in 1719.

See also
 List of ships captured in the 18th century

Notes

References

 Lavery, Brian (2003) The Ship of the Line - Volume 1: The development of the battlefleet 1650-1850. Conway Maritime Press. .
 Michael Phillips. Blackwall (48) (1696). Michael Phillips' Ships of the Old Navy. Retrieved 2 March 2008.
 
 Winfield, Rif (2009) British Warships in the Age of Sail 1603-1714: Design, Construction, Careers and Fates. Seaforth Publishing. .

Ships of the line of the Royal Navy
1690s ships
Ships built by the Blackwall Yard